Barnet Run is a stream in the U.S. state of West Virginia.

Barnet Run most likely was named after William Barnett, a local pioneer.

See also
List of rivers of West Virginia

References

Rivers of Nicholas County, West Virginia
Rivers of Webster County, West Virginia
Rivers of West Virginia